Pigorini may refer to:

 Luigi Pigorini (1842–1925), Italian palaeoethnologist, archaeologist and ethnographer
 Palazzo Pigorini, palace in Parma
 Pigorini National Museum of Prehistory and Ethnography, museum in Rome